Z Brewer, previously known as Zac Brewer (born Heather Brewer; September 21, 1973), is an American writer of young adult fiction. Their debut series, The Chronicles of Vladimir Tod, was published by Dutton Juvenile.

Personal life 
Brewer grew up with a history of being bullied, which led them to become an anti-bullying and mental health awareness advocate.

Brewer lives in Missouri with their husband, child, and four cats.

Publications

The Chronicles of Vladimir Tod
 Eighth Grade Bites (Dutton Juvenile, 2007)
 Ninth Grade Slays (Dutton Juvenile, 2008)
 Tenth Grade Bleeds (Dutton Juvenile, 2009)
 Eleventh Grade Burns (Dutton Juvenile, February 9, 2010)
 Twelfth Grade Kills (Dutton Juvenile, September 19, 2010)

The Slayer Chronicles
A spin-off trilogy of the Vladimir Tod series.
 First Kill (Dutton Juvenile, September 20, 2011)
 Second Chance (Dutton Juvenile, October 16, 2012)
 Third Strike (Dutton Juvenile, February 20, 2014)

Legacy of Tril
 Soulbound (Dial Books, June 19, 2012)
‘’Soulbroken’’

Stand-alone novels
 The Cemetery Boys (HarperCollins, March 31, 2015)
 The Blood Between Us (HarperCollins, May 3, 2016)
Madness (Harper Teen, September 19, 2017)
Into the Real (HarperCollins, October 6, 2020)

Short stories and anthologies 
 The Ghost of Ben Hargrove (HarperCollins, October 7, 2014)
 Foretold: 14 Tales of Prophecy and Prediction (Delacorte Press, August 28, 2012)
 Dear Bully: Seventy Authors Tell Their Stories (HarperCollins, September 6, 2011)
 Eternal: More Love Stories with Bite (Smart Pop, November 2, 2010)
 Fear: 13 Stories of Suspense and Horror (Dutton Books for Young Readers, September 2, 2010)

References

External links

 

1973 births
21st-century American novelists
American bloggers
American children's writers
American writers of young adult literature
Living people
Video bloggers
American LGBT writers
21st-century American male writers